Trithemis nuptialis is a species of dragonfly in the family Libellulidae. It is found in Angola, Cameroon, Central African Republic, the Republic of the Congo, the Democratic Republic of the Congo, Ivory Coast, Equatorial Guinea, Gabon, Guinea, Liberia, Niger, Nigeria, Sierra Leone, Tanzania, Uganda, and Zambia. Its natural habitats are subtropical or tropical moist lowland forests and rivers.

References

nuptialis
Taxonomy articles created by Polbot
Insects described in 1894